John Parsons Wheeler III (December 14, 1944 – ), known as Jack Wheeler, was an American businessman and former White House aide. Wheeler was chairman of the Vietnam Veterans Memorial Fund, senior planner for Amtrak (1971–1972), official of the Securities and Exchange Commission (1978–1986), chief executive and CEO of Mothers Against Drunk Driving, consultant to the Mitre Corporation (2009–death), and a presidential aide to the Ronald Reagan, George H. W. Bush, and George W. Bush administrations. He also held numerous other positions in the United States military, government, and corporations. He died under mysterious circumstances on December 30, 2010.

Early life
Wheeler was descended from a family of military professionals which included Joseph Wheeler, who had served as a general both in the Confederate Army, and later with the United States Army. Wheeler III was born in Laredo, Texas, where his mother, Janet Conly Wheeler, was staying with her mother while his father was in Europe. Five days after the delivery, the family received a telegram that his father was missing in action in the Battle of the Bulge. His father was later found to be alive.  Wheeler had one younger brother, Robert Conly Wheeler, and one younger sister, Janet Wheeler Gilani.

Military career
Wheeler was a member of the United States Military Academy class of 1966 which lost 30 of its members in the Vietnam War.

After graduation from West Point, he was a fire control platoon leader at a MIM-14 Nike-Hercules base at Franklin Lakes, New Jersey from 1966 to 1967. From 1967 to 1969, he was a graduate student at Harvard Business School spending the summer of 1968 as a systems analyst for the Office of Secretary of Defense in Washington, D.C. From 1969 to 1970, he served in a non-combat position at Long Binh in Vietnam. From 1970 to 1971, he served on the General Staff at The Pentagon

Wheeler's West Point and later years are featured prominently in Rick Atkinson's book, The Long Gray Line: The American Journey of West Point's Class of 1966.

Law career
After leaving the military he was a senior planner for Amtrak in 1971 and 1972. From 1972 to 1975 he attended law school at Yale University becoming a clerk for George E. MacKinnon in 1975–76 and an associate for Shea & Gardner in 1976–1978. From 1978 to 1986, he was assistant general counsel, special counsel to the chairman, and the secretary of the Securities and Exchange Commission.

Vietnam Veterans Memorial
From 1979 to 1989, Wheeler was chairman of Vietnam Veterans Memorial Fund which built the Vietnam Veterans Memorial, opening in 1982. Working with Jan Scruggs and Robert W. Doubek, he supported the controversial Maya Lin design, which was opposed by Ross Perot and Jim Webb, who both tried to oust him as chairman of the memorial. Wheeler worked to address their issues by adding The Three Soldiers sculpture by Frederick Hart to the memorial.

In 1983, Carlton Sherwood ran a four-part series on WDVM-TV (now WUSA) "Vietnam Memorial: A Broken Promise?" which focused on Wheeler's handling of the Memorial Fund, claiming that most of the $9 million raised for the memorial was improperly accounted for. Sherwood cast aspersions on Wheeler's career, questioning his decision not to go directly to Vietnam out of West Point and noting he had been disciplined shortly after arriving there in 1969 for "misappropriation" of government property. A General Accounting Office audit spurred by the television report cleared Wheeler. WDVM officials made an on-air apology and donated $50,000 to the memorial. In 1984, Wheeler published a memoir, Touched with Fire: The Future of the Vietnam Generation.

In the 1988 television film To Heal a Nation about the construction of the Vietnam Memorial, Wheeler was played by Marshall Colt, four years his junior and the former co-star with James Arness in the crime drama McClain's Law. Eric Roberts portrayed Jan Scruggs; Glynnis O'Connor, Becky Scruggs', Jan's wife. On November 11, 1988, Wheeler introduced President Reagan at the Memorial before the latter observed his final Veterans' Day there.

Other service
In 1988–1989, Wheeler worked with President George H. W. Bush to establish the Earth Conservation Corps. From 1997 to 2001, he was president and CEO, Deafness Research Foundation. He was consultant to acting Under Secretary of Defense for Acquisition, Technology and Logistics from 2001 to 2005, special assistant to the Secretary of the Air Force from 2005 to 2008. From 2008 to 2009, he was special assistant to the acting assistant Secretary of the Air Force for Installations, Logistics and Energy. From 1983 to 1987, he was chairman and CEO of Mothers Against Drunk Driving, and from 1993 until his death, he was the founding CEO of the Vietnam Children's Fund.

Family
Wheeler was twice married. He had two children from his first marriage, twins John Parsons Wheeler, IV, and Katherine Marie Wheeler. He also has two stepdaughters from his marriage to Katherine Klyce, Byrd Schas Chaskes and Meriwether Klyce Schas. His younger brother Robert predeceased him.

Death
Wheeler was seen on CCTV on December 28, 2010, exiting an Amtrak train, and later, on the afternoon of December 30, 2010, at 10th and Orange streets in Wilmington, Delaware. On December 31, his body was seen by a landfill worker as it fell onto a trash heap in the Cherry Island Landfill. Police ruled his death a homicide and claimed that "all the stops made Friday (December 31) by the garbage truck before it arrived at the landfill involved large commercial disposal bins in Newark (Delaware), several miles from Wheeler's home."

Wheeler's neighbor of seven months, Ron Roark, said that he had met Wheeler only once and rarely saw him. Roark claimed that, in the days prior to Wheeler's death, he (Roark) and his family heard, from outside the Wheeler residence, a loud television within the home that was constantly on, though no one appeared to be home.

According to The Washington Post, Wheeler was sighted on December 29 at the New Castle County courthouse parking garage, disoriented and wearing only one shoe, as the other was ripped. While he attempted to gain access to the parking garage on foot, Wheeler claimed that he wanted to warm up before paying a parking fee. (Police later determined that his car was actually in a different parking garage at the train station.) Wheeler explained to the parking garage attendant that his briefcase had been stolen and assured her he was not intoxicated. It is also claimed that, on December 29, Wheeler asked a pharmacist in New Castle for a ride to Wilmington and "looked upset." The pharmacist offered to call a cab for Wheeler, at which point Wheeler left the store.

On December 30, Wheeler was sighted wandering about various office buildings, including Mitre and DuPont locations, where he refused offers of assistance from several individuals. On January 28, 2011, the Delaware state medical examiner's office reported Wheeler's cause of death as assault and "blunt force trauma" without elaboration.

Wheeler's remains were interred at Arlington National Cemetery with full military honors on April 29, 2011.

See also
 List of unsolved murders

Bibliography

References

External links
 Wheeler interview and editorials in the "Death of deafness" series, Hearing Health magazine, 2000
Unsolved Mysteries Season 2 Episode 1 -Netflix 2020 IMDb

1944 births
2010 deaths
Activists from Texas
American businesspeople
Date of death unknown
Deaths by beating in the United States
Burials at Arlington National Cemetery
Harvard Business School alumni
Male murder victims
People from Laredo, Texas
People from New Castle County, Delaware
People murdered in Delaware
United States Army officers
United States Military Academy alumni
Unsolved murders in the United States
Yale Law School alumni
American murder victims
Military personnel from Texas